Clivina castanea is a species of ground beetle in the subfamily Scaritinae. It was described by Westwood in 1837.

References

castanea
Beetles described in 1837